Just like a Woman is a 1939 British comedy film directed by Paul L. Stein and starring Felix Aylmer, Jeanne de Casalis and Fred Emney. The film's plot follows a group of private detectives working for a jeweller who pursue a gang of thieves in Argentina.

It was made at Associated British Studios, Elstree.

Cast
 Felix Aylmer as Sir Robert Hummel
 David Burns as Pedro
 Jeanne de Casalis as Poppy Mayne
 Fred Emney as Sir Charles Devoir
 Henry Hewitt as Simpson
 Anthony Ireland as Roderique
 John Lodge as Tony Walsh
 Gertrude Michael as Ann Heston
 Hartley Power as Al
 Ralph Truman as Maharajah
 Arthur Wontner as Escubar

References

Bibliography
 Low, Rachael. Filmmaking in 1930s Britain. George Allen & Unwin, 1985.
 Wood, Linda. British Films, 1927-1939. British Film Institute, 1986.

External links
 

1939 films
1939 comedy films
British comedy films
Films shot at Associated British Studios
Films directed by Paul L. Stein
British black-and-white films
1930s English-language films
1930s British films
English-language comedy films